The 2022–23 is the 135th season in the existence of Sparta Rotterdam and the club's fourth consecutive season in the top flight of Dutch football. In addition to the domestic league, Sparta Rotterdam participated in this season's edition of the KNVB Cup.

Players

First-team squad

Reserve squad

Players out on loan

Transfers

In

Out

Pre-season and friendlies

Competitions

Overall record

Eredivisie

League table

Results summary

Results by round

Matches
The league fixtures were announced on 17 June 2022.

KNVB Cup

Statistics

Clean sheets

References

Sparta Rotterdam seasons
Sparta Rotterdam